This was the first edition of the tournament.

Panna Udvardy won the title, defeating Laura Pigossi in the final, 6–2, 7–5.

Seeds
All seeds receive a bye into the second round.

Draw

Finals

Top half

Section 1

Section 2

Bottom half

Section 3

Section 4

References

External links
Main draw

Barranquilla Open - Singles